The Ed Robson Arena in Colorado Springs, Colorado is a 3,400-seat ice hockey arena on the campus of Colorado College. The arena opened on September 18, 2021.

History
Plans for a school-run arena date as far back as 2008 in the Colorado College Long Range Development Plan. At the time of planning, the Robson arena would be the second smallest facility in the NCHC, ahead of just the Goggin Ice Center on the Miami University campus. Colorado College justified this decision due to both the small undergraduate size of the college (approximately 2,000) and the average actual attendance of Tiger games (about 2,800). 

Construction started in February of 2020 and in spite of the COVID-19 pandemic, the arena was opened ahead of schedule in mid-September 2021. It succeeded the Broadmoor World Arena as the home for the Colorado College Tigers ice hockey team and became the first on-campus home for the program after 82 years of operation.

Namesake
Edward J. Robson is a 1954 graduate of Colorado College and played three years of varsity ice hockey. He is Chairman and CEO of his own real estate company, Robson Resort Communities.

Events 
With the arena's opening, there has been a plethora of different leagues and games getting ice time. Also, there is open skating and arena tour times that get posted on all Ed Robson's social media platforms.

Despite being a hockey arena, there are many other events that go on here. There is a multipurpose event room, 'Chapman Room' that is perfect for luncheons, meetings, class times, etc. The Chapman Room has a small catering kitchen that is run by Bon Appétit, along with a decent size patio for warmer weather.

References

External links
 Official Site

College ice hockey venues in the United States
Indoor ice hockey venues in the United States
Sports venues in Colorado Springs, Colorado
2021 establishments in Colorado